Ximen Metro Mall is an underpass located in Wanhua District, Taipei, Taiwan. It is located directly underneath Zhonghua Road and is connected with Ximen metro station.

History
 In 1999, the construction of Ximen Metro Mall was complete.
 Ximen Metro Mall officially started operation on December 1, 2002.

Structure

Gallery

See also
 Zhongshan Metro Mall
 Taipei City Mall
 East Metro Mall
 Station Front Metro Mall

References

2002 establishments in Taiwan
Semi-subterranean structures
Shopping malls in Taipei
Shopping malls established in 2002
Underground cities in Taipei